The 1964 European Women Basketball Championship, commonly called EuroBasket Women 1964, was the 9th regional championship held by FIBA Europe. The competition was held in Hungary.  won the gold medal and  the silver medal while  won the bronze.

Group stage

Group A

Group B

Play-off stages

Final ranking

External links 
 FIBA Europe profile
 Todor66 profile

1964
EuroBasket
EuroBasket
International women's basketball competitions hosted by Hungary
EuroBasket Women
Women